Rocking Moon is a 1926 American silent drama film directed by George Melford and starring Lilyan Tashman and John Bowers. It was released by Producers Distributing Corporation.

Plot
As described in a film magazine review, Sasha Larianoff operates a blue fox farm on Rocking Moon Island, assisted by Gary Tynan. She hopes to pay off a mortgage held by trader Nick Nash with the season's receipts. Sasha's foxes disappear and so does Gary. Nash, who desires Sasha, tells her that Gary has played her falsely. However, Gary has been trapped and bound by invaders of the farm. Escaping, he finds a cavern which contain the missing fox pelts. Gary overcomes Nash, who turns out to be the leader of the bandits, in a terrific fight and wins Sasha's love.

Cast
Lilyan Tashman as Sasha Larianoff
John Bowers as Gary Tynan
Rockliffe Fellowes as Nick Nash
Laska Winter as Soya
Luke Cosgrove as Colonel Jeff
Eugene Pallette as Side Money

Preservation
With no prints of Rocking Moon located in any film archives, it is a lost film.

References

External links

American silent feature films
Lost American films
Films directed by George Melford
Films based on American novels
Producers Distributing Corporation films
American black-and-white films
Silent American drama films
1926 drama films
1926 lost films
Lost drama films
1920s American films
1920s English-language films